Medvedevo is a rural locality (a village) in Medvedevskoye Rural Settlement, Totemsky District, Vologda Oblast, Russia. The population was 153 as of 2002.

Geography 
Medvedevo is located 19 km northeast of Totma (the district's administrative centre) by road. Filinskaya is the nearest rural locality.

References 

Rural localities in Totemsky District